The men's 110 metres hurdles event at the 1998 World Junior Championships in Athletics was held in Annecy, France, at Parc des Sports on 31 July, 1 and 2 August.  106.7 cm (3'6) (senior implement) hurdles were used.

Medalists

Results

Final
2 August
Wind: -0.2 m/s

Semifinals
1 August

Semifinal 1
Wind: 0.0 m/s

Semifinal 2
Wind: -1.6 m/s

Heats
31 July

Heat 1
Wind: -0.8 m/s

Heat 2
Wind: -1.2 m/s

Heat 3
Wind: -0.3 m/s

Heat 4
Wind: +0.2 m/s

Participation
According to an unofficial count, 29 athletes from 19 countries participated in the event.

References

110 metres hurdles
Sprint hurdles at the World Athletics U20 Championships